Mayasisilwa "Nono" Lubanzadio (born 27 January 1984) is a retired Congolese football defender.

Career
Lubanzadio played club football for TP Mazembe in Democratic Republic of the Congo, and for Black Leopards F.C. in South Africa's Premier Soccer League.

He was a member of the Congolese 2006 African Nations Cup team, who progressed to the quarter finals, where they were eliminated by Egypt, who eventually won the tournament.

References

External links

1984 births
Living people
Footballers from Kinshasa
Democratic Republic of the Congo footballers
Democratic Republic of the Congo international footballers
2006 Africa Cup of Nations players
Association football defenders
SC Cilu players
TP Mazembe players
Democratic Republic of the Congo expatriate footballers
Democratic Republic of the Congo expatriate sportspeople in South Africa
Expatriate soccer players in South Africa
Black Leopards F.C. players